Apolipoprotein L domain containing 1 is a protein in humans that is encoded by the APOLD1 gene.
 It is located on Chromosome 12.

APOLD1 is an endothelial cell early response protein that may play a role in regulation of endothelial cell signaling and vascular function (Regard et al., 2004 [PubMed 15102925]).[supplied by OMIM, Dec 2008].

References

External links

Further reading